Two human polls and a committee's selections comprise the 2021 National Collegiate Athletic Association (NCAA) Division I Football Bowl Subdivision (FBS) football rankings, in addition to various publications' preseason polls. Unlike most sports, college football's governing body, the NCAA, does not bestow a national championship at the FBS level. Instead, that title is bestowed by one or more different polling agencies. There are two main weekly polls that begin in the preseason—the AP Poll and the Coaches Poll. One additional poll, the College Football Playoff (CFP) ranking, is usually released starting midway through the season. The CFP rankings determine who makes the four-team playoff that determines the College Football Playoff National Champion.

Legend

AP Poll

Ranking highlights
Preseason
 Iowa State received its highest ranking (No. 7) in program history.
 Coastal Carolina and Louisiana, respectively No. 22 and No. 23, were the first Sun Belt Conference teams ever ranked in the preseason.
Week 5
Clemson's long streak of poll rankings ends.
Week 6
 Cincinnati received its highest ranking (No. 3) in program history.
Week 7
 UTSA was ranked for the first time in program history at No. 24.
 Cincinnati received its highest ranking (No. 2) in program history.
Week 8
UTSA received its highest ranking (No. 23) in program history.
Week 9
Wake Forest received its highest ranking (No. 10) in program history.
UTSA received its highest ranking (No. 16) in program history.
Week 10
UTSA received its highest ranking (No. 15) in program history.
Final Poll
 Cincinnati received its highest final ranking (No. 4).  Its previous high was No. 8 in 2009 and 2020.
 Baylor received its highest final ranking (No. 5).  Its previous high was No. 7 in 2014.
 Wake Forest received its highest final ranking (No. 15).  Its previous high was No. 18 in 2006.

Coaches Poll

CFP rankings
The initial 2021 College Football Playoff rankings were released on Tuesday, November 2, 2021.

Notes

References

Rankings
NCAA Division I FBS football rankings
Rankings